Black Ankle may refer to:

Black Ankle, North Carolina, an unincorporated community in Montgomery County
Black Ankle, Texas, an unincorporated community in San Augustine County